Guanzong Temple is a Buddhist temple located in Haishu District of Ningbo, Zhejiang, China.

History
The temple traces its origins to the former Shiliuguan-tang, founded by monk Jieran in the Yuanfeng era (1078–1085) of the Northern Song dynasty (960–1127) and would later become "Guanzong Temple" in early Republic of China. In early Republic of China, Zhang Daqian came to the temple to study Buddhism under master .

During the ten-year Cultural Revolution, the Red Guard had attacked the temple, wooden statues of the Five Hundred Arhat and statues of "Three-Life Buddha" were demolished by Red Guards. Halls of the temple were used as warehouse, school and conference hall.

On December 5, 1981, it was inscribed as a municipal level cultural heritage by the local government. In 1993, the Ningbo Municipal Government invited Yixing, the acting abbot of Guoqing Temple and forty-seventh generation of Tiantai school, to restore the temple.

Architecture
Now the existing main buildings include Four Heavenly Kings Hall, Mahavira Hall and wing-rooms.

Four Heavenly Kings Hall

Mahavira Hall
The roof is supported by stone columns.

References

Buddhist temples in Ningbo
Buildings and structures in Ningbo
Tourist attractions in Ningbo
20th-century establishments in China
20th-century Buddhist temples